The National High Speed Rail Corporation Limited (NHSRCL) has been incorporated since 2016 to manage the High Speed Rail Corridor in India. It is a wholly owned subsidiary of the Indian Railways, Ministry of Railways, Government of India.

NHSRCL was formed under the Companies Act, 2013. The objective of this body is the development and implementation of the high-speed rail projects in India. The corporation is a ‘Special Purpose Vehicle’ (SPV) in the joint sector with equity participation of the Ministry of Railways, Government of India and two State Governments - Gujarat and the Maharashtra.

Headquarters
The company with estimated employees of 4,500 people (approximately) , its headquarters are situated on 2nd Floor, Asia Bhawan, Road no. 205, Sector 9, Dwarka, New Delhi – 110077.

Projects

The NHSRCL is currently managing the planning and construction of twelve high-speed rail corridors. Out of which one is under construction and seven are approved. Once completion of these corridors, NHSRCL will further extend the lines to form a network of high-speed rail connectivity in India, which is also known as the Diamond Quadrilateral.

Mumbai–Ahmedabad HSR

It is the first High-speed rail corridor to be implemented in India, with technical and financial assistance of the Japan, with total twelve stations in the States of Maharashtra, Gujarat and Union Territory of Dadra and Nagar Haveli. The high speed rail corridor will have a length of 508.17 km with 155.76 km in the state of Maharashtra (7.04 km in Mumbai sub-urban, 39.66 km in Thane district & 109.06 km in Palghar district), 4.3 km in Union territory of Dadra & Nagar Haveli and 348.04 km in the state of Gujarat.

The High speed rail corridor will cover total 12 stations namely Mumbai, Thane, Virar and Boisar (in Maharashtra), Vapi, Bilimora, Surat, Bharuch, Vadodara, Anand, Ahmedabad and Sabarmati (in Gujarat). A limited stop (in Surat & Vadodara) service of the high speed rail corridor will cover the route in 1 hr. and 58 mins and all stops service will take 2 hr. 57 min to cover this route.

Delhi–Ahmedabad HSR

The Detailed Project Report (DPR) of Delhi–Ahmedabad high-speed rail corridor has been prepared and this corridor is waiting for approval and land acquisition to start.

Delhi–Lucknow–Varanasi HSR

Delhi-Varanasi high speed rail corridor is India's second bullet train project after the Mumbai Ahmedabad High Speed Rail Corridor. The 865 km HSR corridor will connect Varanasi to NCR through 12 stations.

Varanasi–Patna–Howrah HSR

The Detailed Project Report (DPR) of Varanasi–Howrah high-speed rail corridor is being prepared.

Chennai–Bengaluru-Mysuru HSR

It will be first high speed rail corridor in Southern part of India.

Mumbai–Nagpur HSR

The Detailed Project Report (DPR) of Mumbai–Nagpur high-speed rail corridor is being prepared.

See also
 High-speed rail in India
 Urban rail transit in India

References

External links
Official Website

2016 establishments in India
Government-owned companies of India
Railway companies of India
High-speed rail in India